Martin Andreasson (born 1 October 1970 in Malmö), is a Swedish Liberal People's Party politician, a member of the Riksdag 2002–2006. He is openly gay. He is also an active member of Swedish science fiction fandom.

References 

1970 births
Living people
Politicians from Malmö
Members of the Riksdag from the Liberals (Sweden)
Members of the Riksdag 2002–2006
Gay politicians
Swedish LGBT politicians
LGBT legislators